Ghatshila College, established in 1961, is a general degree college in the East Singhbhum district. It offers undergraduate and postgraduate courses in arts, commerce and sciences. It is affiliated to  Kolhan University.

See also
Education in India
Literacy in India
List of institutions of higher education in Jharkhand

References

External links
http://www.ghatsilacollege.in/

Colleges affiliated to Kolhan University
Universities and colleges in Jharkhand
East Singhbhum district